The .17 PMC/Aguila or .17 High Standard is a rimfire cartridge formed by necking down the .22 Long Rifle casing to accept a .172" diameter bullet.  This cartridge was developed in 2003 by firearms maker High Standard and ammunition maker Aguila and introduced in 2004.  The introduction was ill-timed, however, coming in the middle of the introduction of two major new .17 rimfire cartridges from Hornady, which took over the .17 caliber rimfire market.

The .17 Aguila can be shot in a rifle that is chambered for .17 HM2.

See also
List of handgun cartridges
List of rifle cartridges
4 mm caliber

References

External links
Aguila Website
Brownell's comparison of .17 HS/Aguila/PMC and .17 HM2 cartridges

Pistol and rifle cartridges